Stankevičius Cabinet was the 7th cabinet of Lithuania since 1990. It consisted of the Prime Minister and 19 government ministers.

Laurynas Stankevičius of the Democratic Labour Party of Lithuania was appointed the Prime Minister by President Algirdas Brazauskas on 23 February 1996, after the previous Prime Minister, Adolfas Šleževičius, was dismissed by the parliament in wake of a financial scandal. The government received its mandate and started its work on 19 March 1996, after the Seimas gave assent to its program.

The government served until the end of the term of the Sixth Seimas, returning its mandate in October 1996. The government continued to serve in an acting capacity until the new government headed by Gediminas Vagnorius started its work on 10 December 1996.

Cabinet
The following ministers served on the Stankevičius Cabinet.

References 

Cabinet of Lithuania
1996 establishments in Lithuania
1996 disestablishments in Lithuania
Cabinets established in 1996
Cabinets disestablished in 1996